Ferdinand (March 12, 1983 – 2002) was a champion Thoroughbred racehorse who won the 1986 Kentucky Derby and 1987 Breeders' Cup Classic and was the 1987 Horse of the Year.

He entered stud in 1989 and was later sold to a breeding farm in Japan in 1994.

Much to the outrage of many horse racing enthusiasts, reports indicate that in 2002, Ferdinand was sent to slaughter in Japan with no fanfare or notice to previous owners. He likely became either pet food or steaks for human consumption. Ferdinand's death was the catalyst for the Ferdinand Fee, an optional donation program to fund keeping old racehorses alive, and Friends of Ferdinand, a nonprofit group formed in 2005 with the goal of transitioning retired racehorses into second careers.

In September 2006, the United States House of Representatives approved H.R. 503, the American Horse Slaughter Prevention Act, which would ban the slaughter of horses in the United States. The bill did not make it out of committee in the Senate, however. In January 2007, the bill was reintroduced. As of 2012, the act has not been passed into law.

The Ferdinand Fee
In the summer of 2006, the New York Owners and Breeders' Association, based in Saratoga Springs, New York, initiated the small voluntary per-race charge (collected from owners of NY Breeds) called the "Ferdinand Fee" that will funnel the revenue to Bluegrass Charities and the Thoroughbred Charities of America, two organizations that help fund race horse rescue and retirement groups.  Another small step in maintaining the safety of Thoroughbreds sent to breeding sheds around the world: Some owners are now including buy-back clauses within their stallion contracts. Reportedly, such clauses were included for Kentucky Derby winner Silver Charm (who was moved to Old Friends Equine in Georgetown, Kentucky upon his 2014 retirement after the buy-back clause was invoked) and Dubai World Cup winner Roses in May, both of whom were sent to Japan.

Racing career
In 1986, Ferdinand entered the Derby under Bill Shoemaker and won the race from starting gate number one.

In 1987, Ferdinand, Kentucky Derby winner of 1986, met Alysheba, Derby winner of 1987, in the Breeders' Cup Classic at Hollywood Park. They reached the wire close together, with Ferdinand winning by a nose over Alysheba. Ferdinand won the titles of Horse of the Year and Champion Older Horse. He was the first Classic winner to win the title, just three years after its inaugural running.

Ferdinand returned to racing in 1988 as a five-year-old, but he lost to Alysheba multiple times. He was then retired and sent to stud.

Retirement and death
Ferdinand retired from racing in 1989 and was sent to stud at Claiborne Farm in Kentucky. Ferdinand was sent to stand stud in Japan in 1994, at Arrow Stud in Hokkaido, where he stood for six seasons. However his popularity among breeders decreased, and in his final year he only covered 10 mares.
His owners tried to place him in a riding club without any success, and left Arrow Stud on February 3, 2001 in the hands of Yoshikazu Watanabe, a horse dealer. Ferdinand's registration in Japan was annulled September 1, 2002, and he was likely slaughtered around that time, according to reporter Barbara Bayer of The Blood-Horse.

Race record

Pedigree

See also

 Old Friends, Inc.
 The Horse Trust
 Thoroughbred Retirement Foundation

References

 Friends of Ferdinand, Inc.
 Death of a Derby Winner: Slaughterhouse Likely Fate for Ferdinand
 New York creates Ferdinand fee to fight horse slaughter
 U.S. House bans sales of horses for human food
 Ferdinand's pedigree with photo
 Ferdinand's Kentucky Derby

1983 racehorse births
2002 racehorse deaths
American Thoroughbred Horse of the Year
Breeders' Cup Classic winners
Kentucky Derby winners
Racehorses bred in Kentucky
Racehorses trained in the United States
Thoroughbred family 13-c